ANAND Group is an Automotive Industry company, with headquarters in Delhi, India. It manufactures as well as supplies automotive systems and components.

Overview 
ANAND Group was founded by Deep C Anand, and named after the founder. The company manufactures automotive components. The company is responsible for introducing different kinds of automotive equipments into the Indian market. Mrs. Anjali Anand Singh is the Chairperson OF ANAND Group India and Gabriel India Limited (The Flagship Company).

The Evolution 
The history of ANAND dates back to 1961, when Mr Deep C Anand, Founder of ANAND and Chairman of the Deep C Anand Foundation, set up his first business venture – Gabriel India. The flagship company of the Group, Gabriel was set up in collaboration with Maremont Corporation (now Gabriel Ride Control Products of ArvinMeritor Inc.), USA for manufacture of shock absorbers at Mulund in Mumbai.

History 

2005 – Mahle swaps with Anand Group to form automotive filter conglomerate

2009 – Takata Corporation engaged with ANAND Group to produce the Safety systems.

2012 – ANAND Automotive invested in non-automotive businesses such as high-end hospitality.

2013 – ANAND Automotive decided to invest ₹1,200 crores over the next five years on new product development.

2014 – January – ANAND Group with 47 facilities manufacturing various types of auto components achieved total sales of ₹5,800 crore.

2015 – March – Auto component suppliers Anand India and Federal-Mogul Powertrain entered into an agreement to convert the sealing and piston ring businesses of Anand into joint venture (JV) operations.

2017 – A technical assistance agreement was signed between Seiken Chemical Industry and Ansysco ANAND 

2019 – ANAND Group signs JV with Joyson Safety Systems 

2020 – ANAND Group Announces Collaboration with FAR and Mazaro

2021 – ANAND Group and Mando Corporation prepare to supply motor and controller for the emerging 2/3-Wheeler electric vehicle market.

References

External links
Official site

Automotive companies of India
Manufacturing companies based in Delhi
1961 establishments in Delhi
Indian companies established in 1961
Manufacturing companies established in 1961